Elma Tryphosa Dangerfield CBE (11 October 1907 - 22 January 2006) was a British journalist, writer, campaigner and Liberal Party politician.

Background
She was born in Liverpool as Elma Tryphosa Birkett but brought up partly in the Philippines, China, and Japan. She was educated in England at Beaufort School, Camberley, and University College London. In 1926 she married Edward Dangerfield. They had one daughter.

She was Secretary, then Director of the Byron Society from 1971-2006.

Political career
She was the Director of the European-Atlantic Group. She was a member of Royal Institute of International Affairs, and a Fellow of the Institute of Directors. She contested Aberdeen South in the United Kingdom general election of 1959. She was Director, of the United Kingdom Council of the European Movement. She was Joint Executive Editor of European Review. She contested Hitchin in the United Kingdom general election of 1964.

Election contests

In 1960 she was appointed OBE. In 2002 she was appointed a CBE.

References

1907 births
2006 deaths
Liberal Party (UK) parliamentary candidates
Alumni of University College London
British expatriates in the Philippines
British expatriates in China
British expatriates in Japan